Steve Crocker is a Canadian politician. He was elected to represent the district of Carbonear-Trinity-Bay de Verde in the Newfoundland and Labrador House of Assembly in a 2014 by-election, and re-elected in 2015. He is a member of the Liberal Party.

Crocker served as Minister of Fisheries, and subsequently as Minister of Transportation and Works in the Ball government.

Crocker was re-elected in the 2019 provincial election. On August 19, 2020, Crocker was appointed Minister of Justice and Public Safety, President of Treasury Board, and Government House Leader in the Furey government.

Crocker was re-elected in the 2021 provincial election. He was appointed Minister of Tourism, Culture, Arts and Recreation and Government House Leader.

Before being elected, Crocker served as an executive assistant to Newfoundland and Labrador Liberal leader Dwight Ball.

Election results

References

External links
 Steve Crocker

Liberal Party of Newfoundland and Labrador MHAs
Members of the Executive Council of Newfoundland and Labrador
Year of birth missing (living people)
Living people
21st-century Canadian politicians